Pseudoleucania luteomaculata is a moth of the family Noctuidae. It is found in the Biobío and Maule Regions of Chile.

The wingspan is 31–36 mm. Adults are on wing from February to March.

External links
 Noctuinae of Chile

Noctuinae
Endemic fauna of Chile